Snafu Lake is a lake of southern Yukon, Canada, about 25 to 30 km north of the border with British Columbia. It is drained by Snafu Creek.

The name is from WWII-era Military slang meaning Situation Normal, All Fouled Up.

See also
List of lakes in Yukon

References
 National Resources Canada

Lakes of Yukon